Shakib or Sakib is a male given name that comes from the Arabic that means "Star" or "Bright". It has also been used as a surname. In Persian, can also mean "Patience." The word "Sakib" is mentioned in the Quran in the chapter of At-Tariq, verse 3.

People
 Shakib Al Hasan (born 1987), Bangladeshi cricketer
 Shakib Arslan (1869–1946), Druze prince from Lebanon
 Shakib Khan, Bangladeshi film actor and producer
 Shakib Qortbawi (born 1945), Lebanese businessman and politician
 Siba Shakib, Iranian/German filmmaker, writer and political activist

See also

References 

Masculine given names